The Honourable St John Brodrick (c. 1685 – 21 February 1728), was an Anglo-Irish politician who sat in the Irish House of Commons from 1709 to 1728 and in the British House of Commons from 1721 to 1727.

Brodrick was a son of Alan Brodrick, 1st Viscount Midleton and brother of Alan Brodrick, 2nd Viscount Midleton; his mother was his father's first wife, Catherine Barry, daughter of Redmond Barry of Rathcormac. He predeceased his father by some months.

Broderick represented Castlemartyr in the Irish House of Commons from 1709 to 1713, the City of Cork from 1713 to 1715 and then the County of Cork from 1715 to his death. On 9 June 1724, he was appointed to the Irish Privy Council. He was also returned as Member of Parliament for Bere Alston on petition on 6 June 1721 after a by-election and returned unopposed at the 1722 general election.

As an MP he gravely embarrassed his father by voting regularly against the Government. Lord Midleton tried to brush over the matter in his private correspondence by excusing his son as a headstrong young man, not easily controlled even by his formidable father, whose bad temper was notorious.

By his wife Anne Hill, daughter of Michael Hill of Hillsborough and sister of Trevor Hill, 1st Viscount Hillsborough and Arthur Hill-Trevor, 1st Viscount Dungannon, he had at least four daughters. One, Anne, married James Jefferyes of Blarney Castle, son of Sir James Jeffreys and father of James St John Jeffreyes. Another, Mary, married Sir John Redmond Freke, 3rd Baronet.

References

External links
 
 
 http://thepeerage.com/p3659.htm#i36586

1680s births
1728 deaths
17th-century Irish people
Politicians from County Cork
Members of the Parliament of Ireland (pre-1801) for County Cork constituencies
Members of the Parliament of Ireland (pre-1801) for Cork City
Members of the Privy Council of Ireland
Irish MPs 1703–1713
Irish MPs 1713–1714
Irish MPs 1715–1727
Irish MPs 1727–1760
Heirs apparent who never acceded
Members of the Parliament of Great Britain for Bere Alston
British MPs 1715–1722
British MPs 1722–1727